Classic Shapewear is a retailer of shaping undergarments for women and men, located in the United States.

The company was formed in 2008 by a group of investors under the parent company Shapers Unlimited, Inc. and was originally intended to serve exclusively as an online retailer. However, the company later expanded to brick and mortar locations in New York and New Jersey. One of the company's most notable characteristics, as quoted by a company executive, is free shipping with every order regardless of the order amount.

Classic Shapewear's headquarters are located in New York City

On January 31, 2012 Classic Shapewear was featured on Jill's Deals & Steals, a shopping segment of NBC's Today Show.

References

Underwear brands
Companies based in New York City